Keith Jobling (26 March 1934 – 20 September 2020) was an English professional footballer born in Grimsby who made 450 appearances in the Football League as a centre half for Grimsby Town. Until overtaken by John McDermott in 2000, Jobling was Grimsby Town's appearance record-holder. After leaving Grimsby he joined Boston United, first as a player and then as successor to Jim Smith as manager.

Jobling died on 20 September 2020, at the age of 86.

References

1934 births
2020 deaths
Footballers from Grimsby
English footballers
Association football defenders
Grimsby Town F.C. players
Boston United F.C. players
English Football League players
English football managers
Boston United F.C. managers
Place of birth missing